G series may refer to:

Transportation
G series (Toronto subway), a line of subway cars
Chevrolet G-series vans
G-series trains, the designation for the fastest long-distance trains in China
Infiniti G-series (Q40/Q60), a line of luxury sports cars
Nissan G engine, a series of engines produced in the 1960s
Series G, a series of Porsche 911

Other uses
G-Series (record label), a music label
ITU-T G Series, telecommunications systems recommendations for transmission systems and media, digital systems and networks
LG G series, a line of Android devices produced by LG Electronics
QI (G series), the seventh series of the TV quiz show QI
Sony Vaio G series, laptop computers
Sony Ericsson G series, a series of cell phones
The G series variety of Gatorade
Lumix G-series, cameras built by Panasonic; see Panasonic Lumix DMC-GF5
G-series, a class of nerve agent

See also
F series (disambiguation)
H series (disambiguation)